Rajskie  (Rais’ke) is a village in the administrative district of Gmina Solina, within Lesko County, Subcarpathian Voivodeship, in south-eastern Poland.

The village has a population of 40.

References

Rajskie